Dogs at Bay is the debut studio album by Australian band Bad Dreems, released on 21 August 2015 via Ivy League Records. The album peaked at number 38 on the Australian ARIA Albums Chart.

Reception

Mikey Cahill from news.com.au called the album "mucky", writing, "On their debut album Bad//Dreems place familiar garage grooves next to the Weetbix-and-Jager vocals of Ben Marwe with almost balletic poise."

Chelsea Deeley from Music Feeds wrote, "Throughout the 12 tracks on this album, stories and anecdotes from a mostly typical Australian upbringing are rife. But it's a welcome slice through the heavy imports that are shoved down our ears daily."

Meredith McLean from The AU Review ranked the album as the 29th best Australian album of 2015, saying "Bad//Dreems stand out against other burgeoning Australian rock bands… rather than entering a retrospective psychedelic culture that is growing more and more in Australia, they've gone back to the pleasure of Australia's pure pub rock… This re-visitation of rock receives a welcomed reception from its listeners."

Track listing
All songs written and performed by Bad Dreems

 "New Boys" – 3:26
 "Cuffed & Collared" – 2:53
 "Bogan Pride" – 3:29
 "My Only Friend" – 2:58
 "Hiding to Nothing" – 3:24
 "Naden" – 4:01
 "Hume" – 3:38
 "Dumb Ideas" – 2:37
 "Ghost Gums" – 3:13
 "Paradise" – 3:52
 "Blood in My Eyes" – 3:17
 "Sacred Ground" – 3:31

Personnel
James Bartold – bass
Miles Wilson – drums
Alex Cameron – guitar
Ben Marwe – vocals, guitar
Ali Wells – guitar

Charts

Release history

References

2015 albums
Bad Dreems albums
Ivy League Records albums